Newton is an unincorporated community in Pleasant Township, Wabash County, in the U.S. state of Indiana.

Geography

References

Unincorporated communities in Wabash County, Indiana
Unincorporated communities in Indiana